The Archery competition at the 2010 Central American and Caribbean Games was held in Mayagüez, Puerto Rico.

The tournament was scheduled to be held from 25–29 July at the Archery Facilities Altos de Samán in Porta del Sol.

Medal summary

Men's events

Women's events

Mixed events

External links

Events at the 2010 Central American and Caribbean Games
Central American and Caribbean Games
2010